Hans Siegenthaler (5 February 1923  2007) was a Swiss football forward who played for Switzerland in the 1950 FIFA World Cup. He played 45 minutes of an international friendly against Yugoslavia on  but was on the bench for their three World Cup games. He also played for SC Young Fellows Juventus beginning in 1943. He retired in 1957 and died in 2007.

References

1923 births
2007 deaths
1950 FIFA World Cup players
Association football forwards
Swiss men's footballers
Switzerland international footballers